The 1980 Major League Baseball season was the Chicago White Sox' 80th in Major League Baseball, and the team's 81st season overall. They finished with a record of 70–90, good enough for 5th place in the American League West, 26 games behind the first-place Kansas City Royals.

In 1979 and 1980, Bill Veeck made overtures to Denver interests. An agreement was reached to sell to Edward J. DeBartolo, Sr., who pledged to keep the club in Chicago. His offer was turned down by the owners. Veeck was forced to sell to a different investment group.

Offseason 
 January 29, 1980: Glenn Borgmann was signed as a free agent by the White Sox.

Regular season 
On October 4, 54-year-old Minnie Miñoso entered a game against the California Angels as a pinch hitter for third baseman Greg Pryor. In doing so, he became the first major leaguer since Nick Altrock to play in five different decades. He grounded out against Angels pitcher Frank Tanana.

Season standings

Record vs. opponents

Opening Day lineup 
 Bob Molinaro, DH
 Alan Bannister, 3B
 Claudell Washington, LF
 Lamar Johnson, 1B
 Chet Lemon, CF
 Harold Baines, RF
 Jim Morrison, 2B
 Marv Foley, C
 Greg Pryor, SS
 Steve Trout, P

Notable transactions 
 June 3, 1980: Future University of Nebraska quarterback Turner Gill was drafted by the White Sox in the second round, 36th pick overall in the 1980 Major League Baseball draft.
 June 12, 1980: Randy Scarbery was traded by the White Sox to the California Angels for Todd Cruz.
 October 3, 1980: Minnie Miñoso was signed as a free agent with the Chicago White Sox.

Roster

Player stats

Batting 
Note: G = Games played; AB = At bats; R = Runs scored; H = Hits; 2B = Doubles; 3B = Triples; HR = Home runs; RBI = Runs batted in; BB = Base on balls; SO = Strikeouts; AVG = Batting average; SB = Stolen bases

Pitching 
Note: W = Wins; L = Losses; ERA = Earned run average; G = Games pitched; GS = Games started; SV = Saves; IP = Innings pitched; H = Hits allowed; R = Runs allowed; ER = Earned runs allowed; HR = Home runs allowed; BB = Walks allowed; K = Strikeouts

Farm system

Notes

References 
 1980 Chicago White Sox at Baseball Reference

Chicago White Sox seasons
Chicago White Sox season
Chicago